Mjømna Church is a parish church of the Church of Norway in Gulen Municipality in Vestland county, Norway. It is located in the village of Mjømna on the island of Mjømna. It is the church for the Mjømna parish which is part of the Nordhordland prosti (deanery) in the Diocese of Bjørgvin. The white, wooden church was built in a long church design in 1901 using plans drawn up by the architect and head builder Anders Korsvold from Gulen. The church seats about 310 people.

History
The new parish of Mjømna was established by Royal Decree of 23 June 1900, separating from the main parish of Gulen. This happened after many years of demands for a new church by the people living in the island region of Gulen. Those residents had a long journey to Gulen Church and they strongly desired a church closer to them. The church was consecrated on 5 November 1901 by the Bishop Johan Willoch Erichsen. In 1973, a small addition was built containing a bathroom and storage area.

Media gallery

See also
List of churches in Bjørgvin

References

Gulen
Churches in Vestland
Long churches in Norway
Wooden churches in Norway
20th-century Church of Norway church buildings
Churches completed in 1901
1901 establishments in Norway